The Frisco Bowl is an annual National Collegiate Athletic Association (NCAA) sanctioned post-season Division I Football Bowl Subdivision (FBS) college football bowl game played in Frisco, Texas, since December 2017. The bowl has a tie-in with the American Athletic Conference, and chooses another team at-large. 

DXL was the bowl's inaugural sponsor from 2017 to 2018, followed by Tropical Smoothie Cafe from 2019 to 2021.

History

On April 21, 2017, it was announced that the Miami Beach Bowl—which had been owned and operated by the American Athletic Conference (The American)—had been sold to ESPN Events and that it would relocate to Frisco, Texas, to be played in Toyota Stadium starting in the 2017 season. On November 8, 2017, it was announced that Destination XL Group, a retailer specializing in big and tall menswear, had signed on as the inaugural title sponsor of the bowl. On December 3, 2017, SMU and Louisiana Tech were announced as the teams for the inaugural playing of the bowl. In 2019, Tropical Smoothie Cafe became the new title sponsor.

The 2020 Frisco Bowl was originally set to be contested by the SMU Mustangs, from The American, and the UTSA Roadrunners, from Conference USA. The game was slated to be the first matchup between the two teams. Two days after the matchup was announced, the 2020 edition was canceled due to COVID-19 concerns with the SMU football team.

Conference tie-ins
Initial planning had been to have teams from The American face a Sun Belt opponent in 2017 and 2019, and face a Mid-American Conference (MAC) opponent in 2018. In 2017, the inaugural game featured a matchup between The American and Conference USA (C-USA).

The Frisco Bowl then secured an affiliation with The American through the 2021 season, with opponents to be selected at-large. The 2018 matchup featured teams from the MAC and Mountain West, as The American was unable to provide a team, due to its champion, UCF, receiving a New Year's Six bowl bid. MAC and Mountain West teams again met in 2019, as The American's champion, Memphis, again received a New Year's Six bid.

Game results
Rankings per AP Poll prior to the game being played.

Source:

MVPs

Appearances by team
Updated through the December 2022 edition (5 games, 10 total appearances).

Appearances by conference
Updated through the December 2022 edition (5 games, 10 total appearances).

Game records

Media coverage

Television

Radio

References

External links
 

 
2017 establishments in Texas
Annual sporting events in the United States
College football bowls
Recurring sporting events established in 2017